Tyle may refer to:

People
 Chris Tyle (born 1955), American musician

Places
 Tyle Mill, England
 Tyle or Tylis

Other
 21970 Tyle, minor planet

See also
 Tile